Elymiotis tlotzin is a moth in the family Notodontidae first described by William Schaus in 1892. It is found in Costa Rica, where it has been collected in the dry forest ecosystem of Peninsula de Nicoya, and in the dry forests of Sector Santa Rosa and Sector Pailas of at elevations between 0 and 800 meters.

The length of the forewings 15.42–19.28 mm.

The larvae feed on Zizyphus guatemalensis.

References

Moths described in 1892
Notodontidae